The 2001 Russian Indoor Athletics Championships was the 10th edition of the national championship in indoor track and field for Russia. It was held on 16–18 February at the Alexander Gomelsky Universal Sports Hall CSKA in Moscow. A total of 28 events (14 for men and 14 for women) were contested over the three-day competition. It was used for selection of the Russian team for the 2001 IAAF World Indoor Championships.

The Russian Combined Events Indoor Championships was held separately on 16–18 February in Chelyabinsk at the Ural State University of Physical Culture arena. In the decathlon, fourth placer Nikolai Averyanov set a Russian under-23 record of 5571 points.

Results

Men

Women

Russian Combined Events Championships

Men

Women

International team selection
Following the results of the championships, taking into account the qualifying standards, the Russian team for the 2001 IAAF World Indoor Championships included:

Men

60 m: Sergey Bychkov, Dmitriy Vasilev
200 m: Oleg Sergeyev
400 m: Boris Gorban, Andrey Semyonov
4 × 400 m relay: Boris Gorban, Andrey Semyonov, Ruslan Mashchenko, Aleksandr Ladeyshchikov, Dmitry Forshev
800 m: Yuriy Borzakovskiy, Sergey Kozhevnikov
1500 m: Vyacheslav Shabunin
60 m hurdles: Evgeny Pechonkin, Andrey Kislykh‡
High jump: Vyacheslav Voronin, Yaroslav Rybakov
Pole vault: Pavel Gerasimov
Long jump: Yevgeniy Tretyak‡, Vitaliy Shkurlatov, Vladimir Malyavin
Triple jump: Igor Gavrilenko
Shot put: Pavel Chumachenko
Heptathlon: Lev Lobodin

Women

60 m: Marina Kislova, Larisa Kruglova
200 m: Anastasiya Kapachinskaya, Natalya Mikhaylovskaya
400 m: Olga Kotlyarova, Olesya Zykina
4 × 400 m relay: Olga Kotlyarova, Olesya Zykina, Yuliya Sotnikova, Yuliya Nosova, Natalya Khrushcheleva, Natalya Antyukh
800 m: Yelena Afanasyeva, Svetlana Cherkasova
1500 m: Natalya Gorelova, Olga Kuznetsova‡
3000 m: Olga Yegorova, Yelena Zadorozhnaya
60 m hurdles: Svetlana Laukhova, Mariya Koroteyeva‡
High jump: Yuliya Lyakhova, Yelena Gulyayeva
Pole vault: Svetlana Feofanova, Yelena Isinbayeva
Long jump: Lyudmila Galkina, Tatyana Kotova
Triple jump: Tatyana Lebedeva, Oksana Rogova
Shot put: Larisa Peleshenko, Svetlana Krivelyova
Pentathlon: Yelena Prokhorova†, Natalya Roshchupkina†

† Had exemption for selection and allowed not to compete at the national championships 
‡ Later withdrew from the international competition

References

Results

Russian Indoor Athletics Championships
Russian Indoor Athletics Championships
Russian Indoor Athletics Championships
Russian Indoor Athletics Championships
Sports competitions in Moscow
2001 in Moscow